The Men's 100 Butterfly at the 2005 FINA World Aquatics Championships was swum 29 – 30 July 2005 in Montreal, Quebec, Canada. Preliminary and Semifinals heats were held on 29 July, with the top-16 finishers from the Prelims in the mornings advancing to swim again in Semifinals that evening. The top-8 swimmers from the Semifinals then advanced to swim the race a third time in the Final the next evening (30 July).

This race consists of 2 lengths of butterfly, in the long course (50m) pool the event was swum in.

At the start of the event, the existing World (WR) and Championships (CR) records were:

The following records were established during the competition:

Results

Final

Semifinals

Preliminaries

References
Worlds 2005 results: Men's 100m Butterfly Heats, from OmegaTiming.com (official timer of the 2005 Worlds); retrieved 2010-01-18.
Worlds 2005 results: Men's 100m Butterfly Semifinals, from OmegaTiming.com (official timer of the 2005 Worlds); retrieved 2010-01-18.
Worlds 2005 results: Men's 100m Butterfly Finals, from OmegaTiming.com (official timer of the 2005 Worlds); retrieved 2010-01-18.

Swimming at the 2005 World Aquatics Championships